Žygimantas Jonušas (born 22 February 1982 in Klaipėda) is a retired Lithuanian professional basketball player. Standing at 6 ft 7 in (2.01 m), Jonušas usually plays as small forward.

Professional career 
Jonušas played for various European clubs over the course of his career, starting with BC Neptūnas of Lithuania. He led BC Alita to the LKL quarterfinals during his stint there, averaging 19.3 points, 5.7 rebounds, 2.6 assists and 1.3 steals per game during the 2004-05 season. He also had a played for Eisbären Bremerhaven, where he averaged double digit points in two out of his three seasons in Basketball Bundesliga.

References 

1982 births
Living people
BC Neptūnas players
BC Pieno žvaigždės players
Eisbären Bremerhaven players
Juvecaserta Basket players
Lithuanian men's basketball players
MBC Mykolaiv players
Basketball players from Klaipėda
Phoenix Hagen players
Small forwards
BC Lietkabelis players